Philippe Rousseau (22 February 1816, Paris – 5 December 1887, Acquigny) was a French painter known primarily for his still life paintings.

Biography
He was a pupil of Baron Antoine-Jean Gros and Jean-Victor Bertin at the École des Beaux-Arts in Paris. He began his career as a landscape painter, but later concentrated on still life and animal subjects.

He exhibited at the Paris Salon from 1834, earning a third class medal in 1845, a second class medal in 1855, and a first class medal in 1848.

Rousseau was made a knight of the Legion of Honor in 1852, and promoted to officer in 1870.

Artwork in public collections

 Le Singe aquafortiste, Magnin Museum, Dijon, France
 1867 : Chardin et ses modèles, Orsay Museum, Paris
  Still life : Nature morte: gibier et panier, Orsay Museum, Paris
  Still life : Nature morte: gibier et plat d'orfèvrerie, Orsay Museum, Paris
 The Fish Market, The National Gallery, London
 Still life with Oysters, The National Gallery, London
 1869 : The Heron's Pool, Bowes Museum, County Durham, England
 1870s : Still Life with Ham,  Metropolitan Museum of Art

Exhibited artwork
 1834 : Vue prise en Normandie.
 1835 : Vue prise à Dampierre près Versailles; Vue prise à Saint-Martin près Gisors.
 1836 : Vue prise à Freleuse près Gisors.
 1837 : Vue prise à Lions en Normandie; Vue prise du télégraphe sur la côte Sainte-Catherine, à Rouen; Vue prise à Dampierre.
 1838 : Vue prise aux environs de Surgère (Charente-Maritime).
 1839 : Paysage.
 1841 : La Chaise de poste, paysage.
 1843 : 3 Still life
 1845 : Le Rat des villes et le rat des champs; Un Chien; Fruits; Still life.
 1846 : Le Chien et le vieux rat; Still life.
 1847 : La Taupe et le lapin; Intérieurs; Fleurs et papillons.
 1848 : Une Basse-cour; Fruits, Natures mortes, gibier .
 1849 : Le Chat prenant une souris; Un Intérieur de ferme.
 1850 : Still life; Fruits; Part à deux ! Still life; Un Importun.
 1852 : Le Rat retiré du monde; Still life; Basse-cour'.
 1853 : Pugargue chassant au marais; La Mère de famille; Still life.
 1855 : Chevreau broutant des fleurs; Cigogne faisant la sieste au bord d'un bassin; Deux Artistes de chez Guignol;  2 Still life.
 1857 : Chiens couplés au chenil; Intérieurs, gibier et légume; Lièvre chassé par des bassets; Résignation, impatience; Intérieur de ferme en Savoie; La Récréation; Perroquets; Pigeons; le Déjeuner.
 1859 : Un Jour de gala; Un Déjeuner. 
 1861 : Musique de chambre; Cuisine.
 1863 : La Recherche de l'absolu; Le Lièvre et les grenouilles.
 1864 : Un Marché d'autrefois; Still life.
 1865 : Chacun pour soi; Fruits.
 1866 : Il opère lui-même; Fleurs d'automne.
 1867 : Chardin et ses modèles; Portrait de chien.
 1868 : Résidence de Walter Scott; Fleurs d'été.
 1869 : L'Été, ou l'ombrelle bleue; L'Automne.
 1870 : La Fontaine fleurie; Premières prunes et dernières cerises 1872 : Les Confitures; Le Printemps.
 1873 : L'office.
 1874 : La Fête-Dieu; La Salade.
 1875 : Le Loup et l'agneau; Les Fromages.
 1876 : Les Huîtres; Les Pavots.
 1877 : Le Déjeuner; Ô ma tendre musette.
 1878 : Les Roses; Le Lunch.
 1879 : Les Tulipes.
 1889 : Le Rapport; Basse-cour.
 1881 : Huîtres.
 1882 : Les deux Amis; Les Fromages''.

Gallery

References

Article largely based on the equivalent article on French Wikipedia

1816 births
1887 deaths
French still life painters
19th-century French painters
Painters from Paris
Officiers of the Légion d'honneur